Papyrus 46 (P. Chester Beatty II), designated by siglum  (in the Gregory-Aland numbering), is an early Greek New Testament manuscript written on papyrus, and is one of the manuscripts comprising the Chester Beatty Papyri. Manuscripts among the Chester Beatty Papyri have had several provenances associated with them, the most likely being the Faiyum. It has been paleographically dated between 175 and 225, or early 3rd century CE. It contains verses from the Pauline Epistles of Romans, 1 Corinthians, 2 Corinthians, Galatians, Ephesians, Colossians, Philippians, 1 Thessalonians, and Hebrews. Some leaves are part of the Chester Beatty Biblical Papyri, and others are in the University of Michigan Papyrus Collection.

Description
The text is written in single column, with the text-block averaging , between 26 and 32 lines of text per page, although both the width of the rows and the number of rows per page increase progressively. Lines containing text at the bottom of each page are damaged (lacunose), with between 1–2 lines non-extant in the first quarter of the codex, 2–3 lines non-extant in the central half, and up to seven lines non-extant in the final quarter. Though unusual for ancient manuscripts,  has each page numbered.

Throughout Romans, Hebrews, and the latter chapters of 1 Corinthians, small and thick strokes or dots are found, usually agreed to be from the hand of a reader rather than the initial copyist, since the ink is always much paler than that of the text itself. Edgar Ebojo made a case that these "reading marks" with or without space-intervals were an aid to readers, most likely in a liturgical context.

Nomina Sacra
 uses an extensive and well-developed system of nomina sacra.

He admitted, however, that Kim's dating cannot be ruled out on this basis alone, since the exact provenance of the nomina sacra system itself is not well-established.

On the other hand, Philip Comfort (preferring a date c. 150–75) notes indications the scribe's exemplar made limited use of nomina sacra or none at all. In several instances, the word for Spirit is written out in full where the context should require a nomen sacrum, suggesting the scribe was rendering nomina sacra where appropriate for the meaning but struggling with Spirit versus spirit, without guidance from the exemplar. The text also inconsistently uses either the short or the long contracted forms of Christ.

Contents
 contains most of the Pauline epistles, though with some folios missing. It contains (in order): the last eight chapters of Romans; Hebrews; 1–2 Corinthians; Ephesians; Galatians; Philippians; Colossians; and two chapters of 1 Thessalonians. All of the leaves have lost some lines at the bottom through deterioration.

(CB = Chester Beatty Library; Mich. = University of Michigan)

Missing contents
The manuscript was initially examined by renowned scholar Frederic G. Kenyon, who, using the number of lines per page and letters per line, estimated the contents of the missing pages. Page numbers on existing pages allowed him to conclude that seven leaves were lost from the beginning of the codex, which accords perfectly with the length of the missing portion of Romans, which they undoubtedly contained. Since the codex is formed from a stack of papyrus sheets folded in the middle, magazine-style, what is lost is the outer seven sheets, containing the first and last seven leaves of the codex.

The contents of the seven missing leaves from the end is uncertain as they are lost. Kenyon calculated that 2 Thessalonians would require two leaves, leaving only five remaining leaves (10 pages) for the remaining canonical Pauline literature — 1 Timothy (estimated 8.25 pages), 2 Timothy (6 pages), Titus (3.5 pages) and Philemon (1.5 pages) — requiring ten leaves in total (19.25 pages). Thus Kenyon concluded  as originally constructed did not include the pastoral epistles.

Overall, Kenyon was open to different possibilities regarding the contents of the lost leaves at the end of the codex. He entertained the idea that the last five leaves could have been left blank or that additional leaves could have been added to the quire to create space for the pastoral letters. Duff argued that this indicated that the scribe intended to include all of the traditional 14-letter collection and would most likely have added extra leaves if the original quire lacked sufficient space. Duff also pointed to several ancient codices that he considered as good evidence for the attachment of additional leaves to codices to allow for the inclusion of more material. The relevance of the ancient evidence that Duff presented has been challenged, but a survey of surviving examples of ancient single-quire codices does show evidence for the practice of leaving some blank pages at the end of a codex. However, this survey also showed that single-quire codices sometimes had more inscribed pages in the second half of the codex than in the first half (due to, for example, blank front fly-leaves). This leaves open the possibility that the original quire may have contained the traditional 14-letter collection after all. Brent Nongbri summarizes:

The question of the contents of the codex as originally constructed thus remains open.

Text 
The Greek text of the codex has been considered a representative of the Alexandrian text-type. Kurt Aland placed it in Category I.

Some notable readings
Romans 8:28
 (God works all things together for good) -  A B 81 sa eth
 (all things work together for good) - Majority of manuscripts

 -  (singular reading)
 - Majority of manuscripts

 (mystery) -  * Α C 88 436 ita, r syrp bo
 (salvation) - ℓ 598 ℓ 593 ℓ 599
 (witness) -  B Ψ Majority of manuscripts

 (plausible wisdom) -  G
 (plausible words of wisdom) - Majority of manuscripts

 (prayer) -   * Α B G Ψ 6 33 81 104 181 629 630 1739 1877 1881 1962 it vg cop arm eth
 (fasting and prayer) -  0150 256 365 Majority of manuscripts 

 (by the Spirit) -  (singular reading)
 (by one Spirit) - A B 0150 33 81 104 436 459 1175 1881 220 2464 vg

 (spiritual man) -  (singular reading)
 (man) - * B C G 0243 33 1739 it vg bo eth
 (man, the Lord) - c2 A Ψ 81 104 181 Majority of manuscripts

 (deadly perils) -  630 1739c itd, e syrp, h goth
 (a deadly peril) - Majority of manuscripts

 -  (singular reading)
 - Majority of manuscripts

 -  (singular reading)
 - Majority of manuscripts 

 -  (singular reading)
 - Majority of manuscripts

Provenance
The provenance of the papyrus is unknown. Kenyon believed this codex and the other Beatty Biblical Papyri came from the region of the Fayyum. The coptologist Carl Schmidt was told that the books were found in "‘Alâlme, a village on the east bank of the Nile in the area of Aṭfiḥ, ancient Aphroditopolis." However, the archaeologists who bought the University of Michigan's portion of the codex believed that it had come from Asyut (ancient Lykopolis). Thus, there is no consensus on the precise find spot.

Date
H. A. Sanders, the first editor of parts of the papyrus, proposed a date possibly as late as the second half of the 3rd century. F. G. Kenyon, editor of the complete editio princeps, preferred a date in the first half of the 3rd century. The manuscript is now sometimes dated to about 200. Young Kyu Kim has argued for an exceptionally early date of c. 80. Kim's dating has been widely rejected. Griffin critiqued and disputed Kim's dating, placing the 'most probable date' between 175–225, with a '95% confidence interval' for a date between 150–250.

Comfort and Barrett have claimed  shares palaeographical affinities with the following:
 P. Oxy. 8 (assigned late 1st or early 2nd century),
 P. Oxy. 841 (the second hand, which cannot be dated later than 125–50),
 P. Oxy. 1622 (dated with confidence to pre-148, probably during the reign of Hadrian (117–38), because of the documentary text on the verso),
 P. Oxy. 2337 (assigned to the late 1st century),
 P. Oxy. 3721 (assigned to the second half of the 2nd century),
 P. Rylands III 550 (assigned to the 2nd century), and
 P. Berol. 9810 (early 2nd century).
More recently, in a wide-ranging survey of the dates of New Testament papyri, P. Orsini and W. Clarysse have assigned  "to the early third century," specifically "excluding dates in the first or the first half of the second century."

See also
List of New Testament papyri
Collections of papyri
Chester Beatty Papyri
University of Michigan Papyrus Collection

Notes

References

Further reading

External links
 Official WWW of Chester Beatty Library, Dublin, concerning P46
 Robert B. Waltz. 'NT Manuscripts: Papyri, Papyri .'
 Reading the Papyri:  from the University of Michigan Papyrus Collection
 At Evangelical Textual Criticism
 Klaus Wachtel, Klaus Witte, Das Neue Testament auf Papyrus: Gal., Eph., Phil., Kol., 1. u. 2. Thess., 1. u. 2 Tim., Tit., Phlm., Hebr, Walter de Gruyter, 1994, pp. L-LII.
 
 Tricky NT Textual Issues: Codex P46

New Testament papyri
3rd-century biblical manuscripts
Early Greek manuscripts of the New Testament
Manuscripts in the Chester Beatty Library
Epistle to the Romans papyri
Epistle to the Hebrews papyri
First Epistle to the Corinthians papyri
Second Epistle to the Corinthians papyri
Epistle to the Ephesians papyri
Epistle to the Galatians papyri
Epistle to the Philippians papyri
Epistle to the Colossians papyri
First Epistle to the Thessalonians papyri
University of Michigan